Ìyá Nlá is the primordial spirit of all creation in Yoruba cosmology. She is believed to be the source of all existence. Iya Nla literally means “Great Mother” in the Yoruba language (Ìyá: Mother;  Nlá: Big or Great). In The Gẹ̀lẹ̀dẹ́ Spectacle: Art, Gender, and Social Harmony in an African Culture, art historian Babatunde Lawal reveals that Ìyá Nlá in Yoruba cosmology is the orisha who is the “Mother of All Things, including the deities.”  Lawal also asserts that the female principle in nature has been personified as Ìyá Nlá (The Great Mother), whereby human beings can relate to one another as children of the same mother.”  Teresa N. Washington’s Our Mothers, Our Powers, Our Texts: Manifestations of Àjẹ́ in Africana Literature, states that Ìyá Nlá — the Mother of All, who is also known as Yewájọbí, Odù, Odùduwà, and Àjẹ́ — is not merely an orisha; Ìyá Nlá is the primordial force of all creation.

References

Further reading 
Drewal, Henry John and Margaret Thompson Drewal. Gẹlẹdẹ: Art and Female Power among the Yoruba. Bloomington: Indiana University Press, 1983.   
Fatunmbi, Awo Fá’lokun.  Ìwa-pẹ̀lẹ́: Ifá Quest: The Search for the Source of Santería and Lucumí. Bronx: Original, 1991. .
Lawal, Babatunde. The Gẹ̀lẹ̀dẹ́ Spectacle: Art, Gender, and Social Harmony in an African Culture. Seattle: University of Washington Press, 1996.  .
Oduyoye, Modupe. “The Spider, the Chameleon and the Creation of the Earth.” In Traditional Religion in West Africa. Ed. E. E. Ade Adegbola. Accra: Asempa, 1983. 374–388. .
Washington, Teresa N. The Architects of Existence: Àjẹ́ in Yoruba Cosmology, Ontology, and Orature. Ọya’s Tornado, 2014.  .
Washington, Teresa N. Our Mothers, Our Powers, Our Texts: Manifestations of Àjẹ́ in Africana Literature. 2005. Revised and expanded edition, Ọya’s Tornado, 2015. . 

Yoruba mythology
Yoruba words and phrases
Creator gods